Shirol Assembly constituency is one of the 288 Vidhan Sabha (legislative assembly) constituencies in Maharashtra state in western India.

Overview
Shirol (constituency number 280) is one of the ten Vidhan Sabha constituencies located in the Kolhapur district. This constituency covers the entire Shirol tehsil of this district.

Shirol is part of the Hatkanangle Lok Sabha constituency along with five other Vidhan Sabha segments, namely Shahuwadi, Hatkanangale and Ichalkaranji in Kolhapur district and Islampur and Shirala in the Sangli district.

Members of Legislative Assembly

See also
 Shirol
 List of constituencies of Maharashtra Vidhan Sabha

References

Assembly constituencies of Kolhapur district
Assembly constituencies of Maharashtra